It's Time was a successful political campaign run by the Australian Labor Party (ALP) under Gough Whitlam at the 1972 federal election in Australia. Campaigning on the perceived need for change after 23 years of conservative (Liberal-Country Party coalition) government, Labor put forward a raft of major policy proposals, accompanied by a television advertising campaign of prominent celebrities singing a jingle entitled It's Time. It was ultimately successful, as Labor picked up eight seats and won a majority. This was the first time Labor had been in government since it lost the 1949 federal election to the Liberal Party.

Origins
In the 1969 federal election, the endorsed ALP candidate for the blue-ribbon Liberal seat of Ryan, John Conn, then a lecturer at the University of Queensland, had employed a highly successful door-to-door campaign. For this, he had devised a pamphlet headed: 'It's Time for a Change' followed by a dot-point list of reasons, including education, the war in Vietnam, urban renewal, etc. He managed a swing of 19 per cent, by far the biggest in Queensland, forcing the incumbent, Nigel Drury, to DLP preferences for the first time. Soon afterwards, at a post-election occasion in Brisbane, John Conn was approached and congratulated by Gough Whitlam and Mick Young together. They enquired about the likely reasons for the successful local campaign. Conn gave each of them a copy of his pamphlet. Young asked if Labor could expect to see a similar effort in 1972. He was told yes but that a shorter, snappier version, 'It's time ...', might be more effective for the next campaign. The originator of the idea heard no more about it until the revamped slogan re-emerged in 1972. John Conn ran again for Ryan in 1972, gaining a further swing but not quite enough to win.

Campaign
The slogan "It's Time", around which the three-stage campaign was built, was conceived by Paul Jones, at the time creative director at Sydney ad agency Hansen-Rubensohn–McCann-Erickson which was handling ALP's advertising account. The goal of the campaign's first stage was to popularise the phrase while the television commercial was the core element of the second stage. Conceived by Jones, copywriter Ade Casey (then known as Adrienne Dames) and art director Rob Dames, it was directed by Ric Kabriel and produced through Fontana Films, Sydney. The song was written by Jones and advertising jingle writer Mike Shirley, it was arranged as well as produced by Pat Aulton. Lead singer Alison McCallum laid down the foundation track at ATA Studios, Sydney. The chorus comprising a "Who's Who" of Australian entertainment and sport personalities, including Tony Barber, Barry Crocker, Lynette Curran, Chuck Faulkner, Jimmy Hannan, Brian Henderson, Col Joye, Graham Kennedy, Dawn Lake, Bobby Limb, Little Pattie, Bert Newton, Terry Norris, Hazel Phillips, Judy Stone, Maggie Tabberer, Jack Thompson, Jacki Weaver, Kevin Sanders, Ade and Rob Dames, among others, was recorded one day in early spring at either the Hordern Pavilion or Supreme Sound in Sydney's Paddington with Joye conducting. The TV spot mainly shows McCallum and the other singers performing the song, intercut are pictures from Whitlam's private photo collection. As well as reaching its target demographic—loosely speaking, women and young people—, "the ad reached a far wider and probably quite unexpected segment of the electorate."

Launch
The It's Time campaign was first launched in Blacktown, New South Wales in 1972. According to Whitlam himself, Blacktown was chosen because it "represented – symbolised even – the new outer suburbs of Sydney, Melbourne and Brisbane where we were building a new constituency. It typified all the urban policy failures of the time, through lack of planning and misallocation of resources at both Federal and State government level."<ref>[http://bancroft.uws.edu.au:20018/logicrouter/servlet/LogicRouter?PAGE=object&OUTPUTXSL=object.xsl&pm_RC=REPOWPMDB&pm_OI=7109&pm_GT=Y&pm_IAC=Y&api_1=GET_OBJECT_XML&num_result=0 Speech at Blacktown Expo Opening, 16 September 1993]  The launch at Blacktown is generally seen as the beginning of the end for the Liberal Party led by William McMahon.</ref>

The speech that Whitlam delivered to the audience in the Blacktown Civic Centre was written for the Labor Party by Graham Freudenberg, the advisor and speech writer to several successive Labor governments.

Themes and policies
The campaign concentrated heavily on the mistakes made by the prime minister of the day, William McMahon, with a special focus given to the areas of the national economy, health care, city planning and the Vietnam War, as well as Whitlam's ideas for governmental reform.

Economic policy
Whitlam put forward an economic plan as part of his It's Time speech that advocated strong, productive relationships between the public, industry and employees. He contended that only if strong economic growth was maintained, would policies in other areas be feasible. A restoration of genuine full employment along with a projected 6-7% growth of industry were predicted. He argued that his government need not increase taxation to achieve its goals.

Health care reforms
The Labor party planned to introduce a universal health insurance scheme, to which contributions would be made according to income, thus turning the old system on its head.

Whitlam declared that the Labor party would set up an Australian Hospitals Commission to promote the modernisation and regionalisation of hospitals. The commission would be concerned with more than just hospital services. Its concern and financial support would extend to the development of community-based health services and the sponsoring of preventative health programs. Labour encouraged sponsoring public nursing homes, and development of community health clinics.

City planning
Labor under Whitlam proposed co-operation with the States, local government and semi-government authorities in a major effort to reduce land and housing costs, and to retard rises in rates and local government charges. To this end they advocated the establishment of a new Ministry of Urban Affairs to analyse, research and co-ordinate plans for each city and region and to advise the Federal Government on grants for urban purposes.

Whitlam claimed that the average cost of housing could be reduced by up to 20% by merely standardizing the reticulation and building and lending authority regulations. He also sought to lower interest payments by making them tax deductible. Labor committed itself to reducing the waiting time for a commission home to under twelve months.

Vietnam War
Whitlam promised an end to Australian involvement in the war in Vietnam and an end to conscription into the Australian armed forces. He underscored the relevance of treaties such as ANZUS to the defence of Australia, but also noted that beginning serious relations with China was in the country's best interest.

It was also announced that all of those previously imprisoned under the National Service Act would be released.

Social justice
Whitlam asserted that education was to be the fastest-growing public sector in Australia, should Labor gain power. In furtherance of this goal, he proposed the establishment of an Australian Schools Commission to examine and determine the needs of students in Government and non-government primary, secondary and technical schools. He promised to increase funding to schools, and to allocate it based on need, accusing his predecessor of having neglected some schools in favour of more prestigious ones.

Whitlam announced that pre-school education would be paid for by the state, and that child care would be heavily subsidised under a Labor government. He also said that university fees would be abolished from 1974.

The ALP saw a great weakness in Australian social welfare in that it relied almost wholly on the provision of cash benefits. Whitlam said he would establish an Australian Assistance Plan with the emphasis on providing social workers to provide advice, counselling and above all the sheer human contact that the under-privileged in the community needed. He also sought to unify the different social justice systems that were in place at that time. Under Labor, the pension rate would be raised to 25% of the average Australian male's earnings.

Political climate

Leadership
By 1972 Australia had been governed by the Liberal-Country coalition for 23 years. However, the Coalition had barely avoided defeat when it suffered an 18-seat swing in the 1969 federal election—one of the largest swings against a government that still managed to keep power. Labor won a majority of the two-party vote but did not win sufficient seats to form government.

After the election, Liberal Prime Minister John Gorton was unable to get the better of Whitlam.  Over the next two years, the Coalition fell further behind Labor in the polls, and Gorton resigned in 1971 after a tied vote of no confidence in the Liberal caucus. However, his successor, William McMahon, was indecisive, and failed to deliver on many of the Coalition's campaign promises.  McMahon was also unable to get the better of Whitlam; his skills as an orator were no match for Whitlam's abilities. One of his own most cited quotes pointed out his indecisive nature.

Foreign relations
The Coalition had focused heavily on relations with the United States since the Second World War to bring Australia under their defence umbrella. Under the auspices of ANZUS, Australia had sent over fifty thousand troops to Vietnam in support of the South Vietnamese forces. The Australian government did not recognise the sovereignty of several communist bloc states including the German Democratic Republic and the People's Republic of China.

Apartheid in South Africa was becoming a huge source of controversy, and there was wide public support in Australia to increase sanctions against the white government there, particularly with respect to their sports teams.

Economy
Unemployment was 2.5% and inflation was sitting on 6.1%. The Australian Dollar bought 1.93 US Dollars, 362 Yen or 1.97 Pounds Sterling. A general downturn in the western economies of the world, and the rising price of oil were contributing to a poor financial situation for Australia.

Success
Labor received 49.7 per cent of the primary vote, leaving the Liberal-Country Party coalition with just 41.4 per cent. Labor, with 67 of 125 seats in the House of Representatives, now controlled Australia's lower house of Parliament by a margin of nine seats. The overall swing to Labor on 2 December was 2.5 per cent. Labor lost four seats while gaining twelve.

The 1972 election was the first ALP victory since 1946. Its success is usually attributed to both the It's Time campaign, and Whitlam's skills as an orator, though Graham Freudenberg had a major influence on many speeches given by members of the ALP during the It's Time campaign. The campaign helped the ALP to establish new voter constituencies, particularly in outer lying areas of Australia's major population centres, who until then were to a large extent marginalised by the major parties.

On his first day in office as Prime Minister of Australia, Whitlam declared an end to conscription and began arranging for those imprisoned for avoiding the draft to be released and compensated. During the next few weeks he implemented a range of new measures including the establishment of an Australian honours system and the banning of racially selected sporting teams, a move intended to impede the South African Apartheid policy. East Germany and the People's Republic of China were also recognised for the first time by an Australian government.

Reforms

During its time in office, the Whitlam Government embarked on an ambitious program of social reform in keeping with the promise of change that the ALP campaign emphasised. The social radicalism of the Whitlam Government was such that, during its first thirteen days in office, some forty important decisions had been made.

As noted by one historian, "Labor’s extensive reforms during its first term in office were the high water mark of Australian postwar social democracy." On coming to office, the Whitlam Government granted federal public servants paid maternity leave, a thirty-six-and-a-quarter-hour workweek, large wage rises and four weeks annual leave. Free tertiary education was introduced, together with a universal health care system and a sole parent pension. Laws were also passed providing for equal pay for women and national land rights, divorce laws were made more liberal, and legislation against racial discrimination was introduced. In addition, the principle of equal pay was extended, occupational health and safety was improved, annual leave loading was introduced, trade union education was established, four weeks of annual leave was achieved as a national standard, military conscription was abolished and Australian troops were withdrawn from Vietnam, a separate ministry responsible for Aboriginal affairs was established, controls on foreign ownership of Australian resources were put in place, laws against sexual discrimination were passed, maternity leave and benefits for single mothers were extended, an attempt was made to democratise the electoral system through the introduction of one-vote-one-value, and a Community Health Program was introduced. The social services were also significantly expanded, with big improvements in the real value of social security payments, spending on housing quadrupled, education outlays doubled, and federal health expenditure rising by 20% A Department of Aboriginal Affairs was also established, while Australia's first federal legislation on human rights, the environment and heritage was initiated.

A significant amount of legislation was passed altogether from 1972 to 1975, with 221 acts passed by parliament in 1973 alone, while the welfare state was significantly extended.http://www.ausstats.abs.gov.au/ausstats/free.nsf/0/EBDEF85F8B618262CA2573A9001E1BA5/$File/13010_1974_chapter13.pdf Public spending was raised significantly, with the 1973 budget quadrupling spending on housing, tripling outlays on urban development, and doubling spending on education. Through initiatives such as the Australian Assistance Plan and the Regional Employment Development scheme, employment opportunities were expanded and funds allocated towards improving services and amenities in deprived areas, as characterised by the construction of new health centres, community houses, legal services, footpaths, sewers, streetlights, and public libraries.

In 1978, one observer praised the Australian Assistance Plan for generating:
"much more general acceptance of the concepts of welfare for the community and local participation. Moreover, a great deal had actually happened. During the year 1975-76, 1408 grants for community welfare projects were approved by the Social Security Department. A detailed list of AAP projects includes projects relating to citizens' advice bureaus, community centres, and resource centres, projects to aid families, women, children, young people, the aged, the handicapped, migrants and the needy. It would be difficult to refute the conclusion that the sum of $6.6 million granted to Regional Councils of Social Development in 1975-76 promoted a very large amount of constructive welfare activity because it was spent in support of local and often voluntary efforts".

Broadcast and television license fees were abolished, while a wide range of new benefits were introduced, such as a handicapped child's allowance, a special orphan's pension, and the Supporting Mothers Benefit. Rates of sickness and unemployment benefits were increased to bring them in line with other social security benefits, while funding was provided for child care, women's refuges, and community health programs. The means test for pensioners over the age of seventy-five was abolished in 1973, and in 1975 the means test was abolished for all pensioners over the age of seventy. As a result of the welfare measures undertaken by the Whitlam Government, social expenditures as a percentage of GDP rose from 12.5% to 17.6% during its time in office.

Needs-based funding for schools was implemented, spending on technical colleges (including the construction of residential accommodation for students) was significantly increased, and special initiatives for the handicapped, Aborigines, and isolated children were introduced. Farmers benefited from tariff cuts and additional markets established by the Whitlam Government's trade and diplomatic initiatives, together with higher spending on regional education and health, rural research, and other upgraded country facilities. A number of measures were also undertaken to enhance women's rights. International conventions on equal pay, discrimination, and the political rights of women were ratified. New health centres and many women's refuges were established throughout Australia, together with a pre-school and child care program which catered for 100,000 children.

In March 1973, the service pension was extended to war widows, and in September that year the means test on service pensions was abolished for recipients over the age of 74. In May 1975 the means test was abolished for the age group 70–74 years. Free artificial limbs were also made available through the repatriation artificial limb and appliance centre to all amputees, while free medical and hospital treatment was introduced for veterans of both the Great War and the Boer War and for ex-prisoners of war. The Mental Health and Related Community Services Act of 1973 made grants available to the states for the provision of community-oriented services for drug, alcohol, and mental problems. In 1973, the age limit of 21 years was removed for the payment of additional pension for full-time students and for the payment of guardian's allowance or mother's allowance, and provision was made for payment of additional benefit for a child to continue after their 16th birthday and without limitation on age if the child was a dependent full-time student.

The government introduced reforms for the superannuation arrangements of its own employees. In July 1973, for instance, the government financed element of pensions was properly indexed against changes in the cost of living for the first time. In August 1973, fair rent provisions for houses and flats were introduced, while a separate housing list for needy families was introduced. In 1974, a generous rental rebate scheme and improved concessions on government loans were introduced to benefit low income earners. Funds were provided to improve the education of handicapped children, while money was also made available for upgrading accommodation in homeless persons' centres, while finance was also made available to centres on a pro rata basis for the provision of meals and accommodation. An Office of Women's Affairs was established to help women achieve equality, while the Legal Aid Office was set up to provide legal representation for those who could not afford it. The Trade Practices Act, passed in 1974, was aimed at promoting competition in the economy and to improve consumer safeguards. Funding on the arts was doubled, and both FM radio and radio station 2JJ were introduced, the latter in Sydney as part of a plan for a national youth radio network.

A number of amendments to the Conciliation and Arbitration Act were also made. The Act was revised to require the democratic control of unions by their rank-and-file members, to require that a union's rules should provide for full participation of its members in its affairs, and prohibited the dismissal of an elected official "unless he is found guilty of misappropriation of funds, gross misbehaviour or gross neglect of duty". The Act was also revised to prevent returning officers from rejecting a defective nomination "without giving the candidate seven days in which to correct the defect", to debar union officials from rejecting a rival's nomination for office, and to prohibit a union official or employee "being appointed as that union’s returning officer".

Tariffs for farming implements and equipment were reduced, and farm incomes more than trebled during Whitlam's time in office. In 1973, a payment of emergency adjustment assistance was initiated to benefit canning-fruit growers and growers of pears and apples, while the Dairy Adjustment Act of 1974 provided generous assistance for financially unsound dairy farms. A number of environmental measures were also implemented by the Whitlam Government. In 1974, the Environment Protection (Impact of Proposals) Act was passed, which was the first piece of Commonwealth legislation to specifically address environmental issues, and set up procedures to review the environmental impact of development proposals which involved Commonwealth Government decisions. In 1973, the federal government awarded $100,000 in grants to environmental centres throughout Australia, the first action of its kind in Australia. In 1975, the Australian National Parks and Wildlife Conservation Act was passed, which allowed for the establishment of the Australian National Parks and Wildlife Service.

The Supporting Mother's Benefit was introduced in 1973 to alleviate financial deprivation among women whose de facto husbands were in jail, deserted de facto wives, unmarried mothers and other wives separated from their husbands who, for other reasons, were not eligible for the widows' pension. The Double Orphans' pension was introduced that same year, providing $10 a week to the guardian of an orphan who had lost both parents. The Handicapped Children's Allowance, introduced a year later, provided $10 a week to the guardians of severely physically or mentally handicapped children who had not been placed in an institution. A special discretionary benefit was introduced for lone fathers in August 1974, payable at the unemployment benefit rate. In February 1973, eligibility for the standard rate of pension, payable to widow pensioners with children and single age and invalid pensioners, was extended to Class B widow pensioners (those over the age of fifty with no dependent children). A change was also made ensuring that pensioners would not lose their extra benefits when a student turned twenty-one. The standard age pension rate was increased from 19.5% of average weekly earnings in September 1972 to 24.4% by December 1975. Social welfare administration was also made more efficient and equitable via the establishment of a Social Welfare Commission and benefit appeals tribunals.

The sales tax on artificial contraceptives was removed, while grants were made for family planning organisations. Maternity leave provisions for the Public Service were introduced consistent with the requirements of ILO Convention No. 103 – Maternity Provisions (Revised), 1952. The Aged or Disabled Persons' Homes Bill of 1974 increased the Federal subsidy for aged persons' homes from two dollars for every dollar provided by a non-profit or local government association to four dollars, while also extending the provisions of the Aged Persons' Homes Act of 1954 to handicapped adults.Contemporary Issues in Gerontology: Promoting Positive Ageing edited by Victor Minichiello, Irene Coulson The Handicapped Persons' Assistance Bill of 1974 extended the government's program of assistance to voluntary organisations responsible for the welfare of handicapped people. While spending on education increased from 4.83% of GDP in 1972–73 to 6.18% in 1974–75, the Federal government's share of funding went up from 22.6% in 1972–73 to 42.5% in 1975–76. The Defence Service Homes Act of 1973 extended eligibility for a loan to current servicemen who had not served overseas but who had served for more than three years, to those who had served overseas under the banner of recognised welfare organisations, and to certain unmarried females with qualifying service. In addition, the maximum loan available under the scheme was increased from $9000 to $12000. For veterans, an expanded system of repatriation benefits was introduced, together with improved resettlement allowances, wider eligibility for defence service housing loans, a $1000 free-tax bonus for re-engagements, an attractive new retirement and death benefit scheme, and a more generous system of remuneration.

The Whitlam Government also sought to extend to Federal public servants the conditions that their State counterparts had long enjoyed. Among the benefits that the Whitlam government introduced for Federal public servants included a reduction in the qualifying time for long-service leave from 15 to 10 years, the removal of job discrimination provisions against women, ample redundancy provisions, a minimum of 12 weeks paid maternity leave with six weeks of paid leave following confinement, one week of paid paternity leave for any employee required to stay at home to care for his wife during or following her confinement, and entitlement to four weeks of annual leave with a 17.5% loading.

The government also financed a wide range of new local government programs through the State, including tourism, urban transport, national estate, leisure facilities, sewerage backlog, flood mitigation, area improvement, growth centres, and senior citizens' centres. Outlays on Aboriginal affairs programs were significantly increased with expenditure rising in real terms by 254.6% for legal aid, employment by 350.9%, education by 97.1%, health by 234.6%, and housing by 103.7%. The Australian Citizenship Act of 1973 established Australian citizenship for the first time on the basis of "one criteria, one national allegiance, one citizenship and one ceremony," while the Roads Grants Act 1974 provided funds for the building of rural arterial roads, urban arterial roads, minor traffic engineering and road safety improvements, rural local roads, developmental roads, urban local roads and beef roads.

In 1973, an improved scheme of allowances was introduced to assist parents of children who did not have reasonable access to school services as a result of their geographic location. The quality of health care in rural areas was also improved via the development of a regional hospitals program and promotion of community-based health services. The Trade Union Training Authority Act of 1975 set up a national college and state centres designed to educate trade union leaders in various aspects of industrial relations. The Commonwealth Secondary Scholarship Scheme was replaced by a system of secondary allowances which were made available on the basis of financial need. An isolated children's allowance was introduced to compensate the educational disadvantages faced by children living in remote parts of the country. Greater spending was allocated to the arts, while spending on urban and regional development was accelerated, which contributed to a significant rise in the number of Australian households connected to a sewerage services. A School Dental Service Scheme was also introduced, providing free dental care for schoolchildren. Via grants to the states, the Whitlam Government funded the construction of 18,500 homes for low income earners from 1973 to 1975.

Various measures were also introduced to enhance educational opportunities. A disadvantaged school program was introduced that provided additional financial assistance for more than 1,000 schools whose students suffered special socio-economic disadvantages. In 1973, capital funds and assistance with running costs were made available for the education of handicapped children while a large training program was initiated for teachers and basic training and research financed for the area of special education. A program of innovative educational projects was successful in providing parents, teachers, and community groups with the first opportunity to try out their ideas for improving education. Over 1,000 projects were funded, ranging from bee-keeping and remedial reading to computers, while a network of educational innovators was set up to exchange experiences and to provide mutual support among people who wanted to be active in improving schools. In 1975, the quality of school curricula was enhanced by the establishment of the Curriculum Development Centre. For those in higher education, the Commonwealth Scholarship Scheme was abolished and replaced by the Tertiary Education Assistance Scheme, which offered means-tested and non-competitive financial assistance for all tertiary students.

Initiatives were introduced to assist teacher training. Following the delivery of a report by the Special Committee on Teacher Education in March 1973, the Whitlam Government introduced various measures to implement its recommendations for special grants to the States for the building of teachers' college libraries, fostering research into teacher education, increasing the number of students training to become teachers of handicapped children, and improving facilities in existing colleges of advanced education. The States Grants (Advanced Education) Act (No. 3) 1973 allocated $188 million for the development of teacher education in pre-school teachers' colleges, State teachers' colleges, and colleges of advanced education throughout 1973–75, while the States Grants (Advanced Education) Act of 1974 provided recurrent financial assistance for non-government teachers' colleges for 1974 and 1975. The first national program for technical and further education resulted from the recommendations of the Committee on Technical and Further Education, established in early 1973. This committee produced an interim report in April 1974 which led to the payment of capital and recurrent grants to the States for building and planning new technical colleges and improving facilities at existing ones, especially with respect to teacher training, library services, research facilities, and student accommodation. The sum total of Federal grants increased from $18.1 million in 1972–73 to $81.1 million in 1975–76. Expenditure on state government schools increased more than sixfold, and more than doubled on non-government schools.

Resources were also allocated towards a program for migrants. In August 1973, an Immigration (Education) Act was introduced to provide (as an emergency measure under the child migrant education program) supplementary class-room accommodation in schools with special programs for migrant children. In 1973–74, the number of teachers for special migrant classes increased from 1,000 to 1,500 and the number of children receiving instruction went up from 40,000 to 60,000. Migrant education centres were established in Brisbane, Perth, Adelaide, Melbourne, and Sydney, while a home tutoring scheme was established, designed to instruct migrant women in the English language. In migrant communities in all the states, 48 multilingual welfare officers were employed to overcome the social isolation of underprivileged groups. Portable benefit rights were also introduced, with respect to age, invalid, wives' and widows' pensions. Whereas under previous arrangements a pensioner had to live in Australia for 20 years after reaching the age of 16 and only had portability rights in Malta, Turkey, Greece, and Italy, the new provisions allowed a person drawing a pension to take up that benefit anywhere in the world after 10 years of Australian residence in the case of an age pension and after 5 years for most invalid pensions, while no period of residence was required for widows permanently resident in Australia when their husbands died.

The voting age was also lowered to eighteen, and grant programs for regional development were introduced, which provided for urban renewal, the construction of sewerage systems in unserviced urban areas, tourist and leisure facilities, and flood prevention. During its last year in office, the Whitlam Government carried out measures such as the introduction of a national employment and training scheme, the first no fault divorce procedure in the world via the Family Law Act 1975, and a welfare payment for homeless Australians. In the field of communications, the Whitlam Government removed the limitations on the amount of non-English-language programming on radio and television and established the experimental ethnic radio stations 2EA in Sydney and 3EA in Melbourne. In addition, emergency telephone interpreter services were initiated in all community languages.

A number of initiatives were also carried out to improve socio-economic conditions for Aborigines. The rate of training Aboriginal teachers and teachers' aides was increased, while the Aboriginal Secondary Grants Scheme was introduced to provide allowances to all students of Aboriginal descent attending secondary schools. An Aboriginal Study Grants Scheme was introduced to assist Aboriginal students in tertiary education institutions, while a scheme was introduced for Aboriginal children living in Aboriginal communities to receive primary school instruction in their own language and in their traditional arts and crafts. To grant Aborigines fairer representation within the legal system, the Whitlam Government significantly expanded the terms of the Aboriginal Legal Service established in 1970. $7.8 million was allocated between 1973 and 1976 to establish 25 offices throughout the country which provided free legal aid to Aborigines irrespective of the seriousness of the case. The offices had a majority of Aborigines on their governing bodies and, as a result, were integrated into local Aboriginal communities and provided trustworthy and effective legal representation. In addition, a change was made whereby Aborigines no longer needed to acquire permission to leave the country. Outlays on Aboriginal affairs programs were considerably increased, with expenditure increasing from $61.44 million in 1972–73 to $185.79 million in 1975–76, representing a real increase of 105.8%. Expenditure in real terms went up by 254.6% for legal aid, 350.9% for employment, 97.1% for education, 234.6% for health, and 103.7% for housing. Federal grants to the States for the purpose of Aboriginal health care increased from $4.4 million in 1972–73 to $21.5 million in 1975–76. An Aboriginal Health Service was set up, whereby health and social workers were trained to provide community-based services either at local clinics or as mobile teams in the field. According to Whitlam, this initiative was successful "in eliminating the barriers that exist between Aborigines and primary health institutions".

The Housing Society Scheme allowed Aboriginal communities to formulate their own budgets in spending departmental grants (taking into account the importance of Aborigines determining their own housing needs), and by June 1975 over 100 housing societies had been set up and 450 houses had been completed under the scheme. The Aboriginal Loans Commission was set up in December 1974 to make personal and housing loans to Aborigines at a discounted rate of interest, and encouraged the incidence of Aboriginal home ownership while helping to overcome discrimination in finance markets whereby Aborigines with steady employment and incomes were often refused loans for reasons related to their race. In June 1973, the Whitlam Government set up Aboriginal Hostels Limited as a public enterprise designed to provide the Aboriginal population with essential and urgent accommodation. By 1975, 74 hostels had been set up, with a combined capacity of 1,677 beds.

The budget presented on 17 September 1974 included a 173% increase for urban and regional development, a 30% increase for health, and a 78% increase for education. In addition, a revised income-tax scale reduced tax payable for people on incomes less than $10,500 a year. The 1975 budget provided funding for the new Medibank health scheme, together with a 2% increase in education, a 5% increase in urban and regional development, a 15% real increase in social security expenditure, and a restructuring of personal income tax.

Despite being in office for only three years, the Whitlam Government was able to carry out a radical programme of progressive social reform, and arguably came far in meeting the promises of change envisioned by its electoral slogan. According to one historian,

"If many Labor supporters regard the Curtin and Chifley governments as a period of great achievements and greater ambitions frustrated by conservative forces, their illusions in the Whitlam government are even more heroic. After nearly a quarter of a century of stagnant conservative rule during which Australia seemed to be a backward looking outpost of the British empire run by monarchists and reactionaries, Gough Whitlam, the Mighty Gough, broke through and during his first 12 months in office remade Australia forever".

Legacy
The words It's Time have become an important contribution to the lexicon of Labor's constituency since their first use in Blacktown in 1972. An updated version of the It's Time song was used in advertisements for the 'Yes' vote in the republic referendum in 1999, which ended with Whitlam saying: "Yes. It's time." In 2000, after another period of Liberal dominance, the phrase had an unsuccessful short-lived recurrence, with Whitlam speaking on behalf of the Leader of the Labor Party, Kim Beazley.  Labor's 2015 Marriage Equality initiative used the phrase "It's Time. Marriage Equality".

The Anti Poverty Network of South Australia in 2018 with the Choir of Hard Knocks of Port Adelaide recorded a revised version of the It's Time song, it included lyrics such as:

"It’s time for changing, not deck-chair rearranging." "Time for poor folk, not rich folk." "It’s time for us folk, yes it’s time." and "It’s time for Newstart, to give a real start, One hundred more a week start, yes it’s time"."

The song is a campaign to the Australian Labor Party to commit if elected at the next federal election to raising Newstart, the Australian Governments Welfare and Social Safety Net for those who are unemployed.

References

Further reading
Detailed results: House of Representatives election 1969, Parliament of Australia.
"Hopes were high...", Sunday Telegraph'', 15 November 1992
Whitlam Speeches: 1972 'It's Time' Policy Speech, 13 November 1972

1972 in Australia
Election campaigns in Australia
Gough Whitlam
Political history of Australia
Australian political catchphrases

pt:It's Time